Silvia Mariscal (born Silvia Ramírez Aguilar on September 13, 1946, in Mexico City, Mexico) is a Mexican actress. She appeared in the 2008 Mexican film Nora's Will.

Filmography

Awards and nominations

TVyNovelas Awards

Kids Choice Awards México

References

External links

1946 births
Living people
Mexican telenovela actresses
Mexican television actresses
Actresses from Mexico City
20th-century Mexican actresses
21st-century Mexican actresses
People from Mexico City